Stichodactyla tapetum, commonly known as maxi-mini carpet anemone is a species of sea anemone in the family Stichodactylidae. It is found in the Indo-Pacific area, primarily around Viet Nam.

Description
S. tapetum is characterized by an oral disc covered in groups of bump like tentacles. The tentacle groups are not typically packed tightly leaving open space to see the oral disc. The tentacles have a rounded tip that is commonly green or brown. Many other colors are exhibited as well such as red, purple, and orange.

Distribution and habitat
S. Tapetum is found near shores and tidepools and is widespread throughout the tropical waters of the Indo-Pacific.

References

External Links
Queen Anne's Corals

Stichodactylidae
Animals described in 1834
Taxa named by Christian Gottfried Ehrenberg
Taxa named by Wilhelm Hemprich